Fairgrieve may refer to:

James Fairgrieve (1870–1953), British geographer, educator, and geopolitician
John Fairgrieve (1926–2014), British sprinter
Mungo Fairgrieve (1872–1937), Scottish educator
Russell Fairgrieve (1924–1999), Scottish politician
Stewart Fairgrieve, Canadian politician
Walter Fairgrieve (1874–1915), Scottish footballer
Fairgrieve Elementary School, school in Fulton, New York, United States